This page describes energy and electricity production, consumption and import in Laos.

Fossil fuel
The Hongsa Thermal Power Station is an 1,878-megawatt (MW) coal-fired power station in Hongsa District, Sainyabuli Province. It is a "mine mouth" facility, fueled by lignite from an adjacent mine. Its three power generating units came on line in 2015–2016.

In February 2021, the Lao government announced that two lignite-fired power plants will constructed in Sekong Province. Work is to begin in 2021 and be completed by 2025. The electricity generated will be sold to Cambodia for 7.2 US cents per kWh. The first plant will be built by Phonesack Group in Kaleum District. It will have an installed capacity of 1,800MW. The company will invest between US$3–4 billion, including the construction of transmission lines to export electricity to Cambodia. The second coal-fired, 700 MW plant will be built in La Mam District by a Chinese company that will invest over US$1 billion in the project. The government claims that coal reserves adjacent to the plants are sufficient to power the plants for the entire 25-year concession period.

Environmental impact
The combustion of fossil fuels, particularly coal, is the main contributing factor to the increase in carbon dioxide (CO2) emissions in Laos. In 2015, coal started to be consumed by the power sector. Consequently, Laos's CO2 emissions increased sharply in 2015. The CO2 to 
GDP intensity increased by 9.8% per year, from 68 kg CO2 per thousand dollars PPP to 278 kg CO2 per thousand dollars PPP. As of 2021, despite cheap hydro power for electricity production, Laos continues to rely on fossil fuels, coal in particular.

Hydropower 

In 2010, Laos petitioned the Mekong River Commission (MRC) to approve their proposal for 11 new dams. This move resulted from the government's intention to become the "battery of Southeast Asia", as Laos currently exports an estimated two-thirds of its hydropower. This goal can be attributed to the geographical region of Laos being situated in the lower Mekong Basin (LMB), which includes a 35% of Mekong's total inflows. According to the Strategic Environmental Assessment (SEA) of the MRC, if the proposed dams are built, they will generate 15,000 MW of power, which is projected to fill 8% of the regional demand by 2025. Additionally, the SEA reports hydropower in Laos can result in a gross income of $3.8 billion per year. With the SEA research, the Lao government's decision to develop hydropower plants is explained by its economic benefit. The Lao Government has ongoing plans for 50+ new hydropower plants for electricity export. However, hydropower development may have large environmental and social consequences beyond national borders. Non-governmental organizations such as International Rivers has raised concerns over these developments in the Mekong.

Xayaburi Dam 
The US$3.8 billion (£2.4bn) proposed hydroelectric Xayaburi Dam has caused tension among Mekong region countries: Laos, Vietnam, Cambodia, and Thailand. In April 2012 a contract was signed for a Thai company, C H Karnchang, to build the dam. The Lao government has pledged to resolve the environmental issues. The government says two big issues—fish migration and sediment flow—will be addressed. Critics say the hydro-electric dam project at Xayaburi would harm the river's eco-system.

Finnish engineering firm Pöyry supported the Lao government's hydropower construction proposal by arguing that no international agreement is needed. Pöyry Engineering in 2012 supported the Xayabar hydropower plant that was opposed by Cambodia, Vietnam and non-governmental organisations. Pöyry admitted it had not assessed all environmental risks (fish, ecosystem). According to Pöyry they have no responsibility for their reports: Olemme pelkkä konsultti ('We only consult') it said in June 2012.

The aim was to supply electricity mainly to Thailand by a Thai company and to provide export income to the government of Laos. However, the Mekong River Commission recommended suspending the project. According to Finnish media, the Finnish government is among the main financiers of the river commission. As of 2012, the Mekong River downstream is free of dams. Approximately 60 million people live in the area in Laos, Vietnam, and Cambodia. U.S. Secretary of State Hillary Clinton visiting the ASEAN countries in July 2012, demanded environmental investigations of the project. During her visit, the Lao government made the first official announcement of project cancellation.

Other renewable energy resources 
Aside from large-scale hydro power, Laos has also significant small-scale hydro and solar energy potential. Laos adopted the Renewable Energy Development Strategy in 2011 and set a target of 30% small-scale renewable energy in the energy production by 2025; to achieve the target Laos could improve renewable energy governance, adopt a feed-in tariff, build an effective regulatory framework and facilitate market entry for foreign investors.

Natural history of the Mekong River basin

Geography 

The Mekong River is the largest river in Southeast Asia, with a length of 4,350 km flowing through six countries: China, Myanmar, Thailand, Lao PDR, Cambodia, and Vietnam. The Mekong River Basin (MRB) incorporates a large area and can be defined by seven physiographic regions: Tibetan Plateau, Three Rivers Area, Lancang Basin, Northern Highlands, Khorat Plateau, Tonle Sap Basin, and the Mekong Delta. The Tibetan Plateau, Three Rivers Area and Lancang Basin form the Upper Mekong Basin while the Northern Highlands, Khorat Plateau, Tonle Sap Basin and Mekong Delta make up the Lower Mekong Basin. Laos is in the Lower River Basin, which has a catchment of 25% of the MRB—approximately 202,000 km2 of water. The region of Laos contains 35% of Mekong's total inflows.

Resources 
The Lower Mekong Basin provides a wide range of benefits: drinking water, freshwater food supplies, biodiversity hotspots, agricultural irrigation, transport, and industrial uses (such as hydropower development). The Tonle Sap region of Cambodia, the largest freshwater lake in Southeast Asia, is critical for food security as it provides areas for agriculture and aquaculture in the surrounding wetlands and flooded forests. This region is the center of Cambodia's fishing industry and rice fields on which 40% of the population depend. Additionally, the Tonle Sap region consists of a variety of habitats and biomes, resulting in an area of biodiversity. Another region of the Lower Mekong Basin is the Mekong delta, a resource vital to Vietnam's rice production.

Environmental effects of hydropower

Impacts on the fish life cycle 
The construction of dams in the Mekong Basin greatly impact fish migration and local fisheries. Generally, the development of a hydropower dam results in altered flow patterns and creates a large physical barrier, thus disrupting the fish and their breeding habitats within the river. This is particularly impactful in the Mekong as 40-70% of fish catch is from migrating species, where most hunted fish can potentially fail to reach historic fishing areas with dams impeding upstream migration. Looking at a 2008 study of Hydropower dams in the Lower Mekong Basin, planned dams will have a major impact on fisheries and "disrupt upstream migration of economically and biologically important species". Additionally, the downstream drift of fish eggs that sustain lower fisheries will be blocked by the construction of dams. Trying to apply modern solutions to fish passage can partially mitigate the impact; however, the scale of fish migration on the Mekong stream involves over 50 different species which current methods cannot support. With the addition of more hydropower dams, local fisheries must adapt to different flow conditions and be prepared for unexpected floods with the potential to wash away assets.

Impacts to Mekong sediment 
With Laos planning over 50 dams on the Mekong and its tributaries, the physical barrier of hydropower dams disturbs natural sediment flow downstream. This barrier can cause water levels to rise and creates a trap for sediment behind walls. Investigations note 26,400 tons of nutrient is sent into the Mekong floodplains per year through sediment loads. With dams in place, the floodplains and agricultural lands that are reliant on a certain level of sediment will be deprived. A report by the International Center for Environmental Management suggest, "current nutrient load will be reduced by seventy-five percent by 2030" if all proposed dams are built. A block to nutrient-carrying sediment sets off a chain reaction that will inevitability impact all nations downstream, lowering food security and putting millions of livelihoods at risk.

Impacts on human development 
The continual development of Hydropower has positive effects such as flood control, irrigation, and river navigation; conversely, the development of Hydropower plants can negatively affect the 3 million Laotians relying on the Mekong for livelihood and food security. With dams blocking the migration of fish, many communities will experience a loss of fish population. Over the last few years, the development of hydropower dams have caused a 10-20% population loss while during a period of 2001–2003, the Thai-Lao border showcased a 50% catch decrease, greatly affecting local communities and their livelihood. With the hydrology of the Lower Mekong forcefully altered, agricultural lands will experience a new river regime—variability in its discharge—that can negatively affect farms. The most notable change for the population near the Mekong is the loss of agricultural land due to flooding from hydropower dams. Flooding can cause a loss of crop, productivity, livestock. With an increase of floods near agricultural land there can be a loss of nutrition, an input to the productivity of nearby agriculture.

The rural communities of a riparian country like Laos rely heavily on fishing for food security.  Hydropower development affecting the migration of fish and productivity of fisheries are a great threat to food security. Local communities are not the ones impacted, a study done by the Mekong River Commission showcased, "Fisheries do not only benefit the people living next to the river or the floodplains, but all of the Lower Mekong Basin countries." Hydropower development indirectly impacts human development on many scales.

Power companies 
Power companies responsible for energy and electricity production in Laos include: Electricite du Laos, Glow Energy (a subsidiary of GDF Suez), Lao Holding State Enterprise and Nam Theun 2 Power Company, a consortium comprising French-owned EDF (40% ownership), Thai (35%) and Lao (25%) entities.

See also
 Economy of Laos

References